Stanley Hiller Jr. (November 15, 1924 – April 20, 2006), was an American pioneering developer of the helicopter.

Biography
Stanley Hiller was born November 15, 1924, in San Francisco, California, to Stanley Hiller, Sr. and Opal Perkins. The family moved to Berkeley, California, in the 1930s.

At the age of 15, he designed the world's first successful coaxial helicopter, and produced a working model. At 17, he presented his design for the XH-44 "Hiller-Copter" to the U.S. Army in Washington D.C., winning not only their approval, but also a draft deferment during World War II. Immediately thereafter, he established the first helicopter factory on the West Coast at 1930-50 Addison Street in Berkeley, California. On July 4, 1944, he tested the XH-44 at the Memorial Stadium at the University of California in Berkeley where he had been admitted as student at age 15. This initial test was followed by a successful public demonstration on the Marina Green in San Francisco adjacent to the U.S. Army's Crissy Field a few months later.

Hiller was the founder of Hiller Industries which, in collaboration with Henry J. Kaiser, became United Helicopters in 1945. In 1948 the company became Hiller Helicopters. After Hiller merged with Fairchild Industries in 1966, Hiller left to pursue a second career as a company turnaround specialist. Hiller created the Hiller Investment Company to realize the opportunities in bringing together strong management groups and effective boards of directors to revitalize companies with large asset bases not being employed as effectively as possible. His strategy was to become chairman or chief executive officer, and not take any compensation until the employees had a turnaround, and the company's shareholders realized their promised returns.

He had a 20-year progression of corporate turnarounds, starting by "cleaning up" mini-conglomerate G.W. Murphy Industries, which the group changed into Reed Tool Co. and in 1979 he sold it to energy giant Baker International. Soon after that success, the Hiller group took control of the nation's largest moving and storage company, Bekins Co., reversing 20 years of declining earnings as a percent of sales. He took leadership roles in of all of the turnarounds, including Baker International, for which he fashioned a merger with Hughes Tool Company to become today's Baker Hughes Corporation.

One of Mr. Hiller's most successful turnarounds came close to the end of his career. At an age when most men contemplate retirement, he persuaded Borg-Warner to spin off to shareholders its failing York International, one of the world's largest air conditioning firms, and put him in charge as CEO. A year after Mr. Hiller took the helm of the once floundering company the company posted a five-fold increase in profits, a 130% rise in stock price, and a stable employment.

Maybe his last turnaround was of the Key Tronic Corporation. In March 1992 he was chosen to lead the company away from the brink of failure. Thanks to Hiller's cost-cutting and labor-saving steps, Key Tronic began to demonstrate signs of a recovery by 1993. Profitability returned to the long-time leader in the keyboard industry after years of torpid financial performance. Hiller's short reign came to end in 1995, his temporary, stopgap work completed.

Stanley Hiller also served on Boeing's board of directors from 1976 to 1998.

On May 25, 1946 he married Carolyn Balsdon who he had met as a student at UC Berkeley. Together, they had two sons, Jeffrey and Stephen. In later years, the couple lived in Atherton, California. Hiller died on April 20, 2006, at age 81 of complications associated with Alzheimer's disease.

In 2004, Hiller was inducted into the International Air & Space Hall of Fame at the San Diego Air & Space Museum.

References

External links 
 Hiller Aviation Museum
 Stanley Hiller, Sr. Collection, 1922-1962. California State Library, California History Room.

Helicopters
Aircraft designers
Businesspeople in aviation
1924 births
2006 deaths
People from Atherton, California